Live à Paris (meaning Live in Paris) is the third live album by Canadian singer Celine Dion, released on 21 October 1996 by Columbia Records. It features primarily French-language songs, mainly from D'eux (1995), but also includes "The Power of Love", "River Deep, Mountain High" and a studio version of "To Love You More" as a bonus track. Live à Paris topped the charts in France, Belgium, Switzerland and Quebec, and was certified 2× Platinum by the International Federation of the Phonographic Industry, denoting sales of over two million copies in Europe.

Content
After having the best-selling Francophone album of all time, D'eux, Dion released Live à Paris, which contains ten out of twelve songs from D'eux. The concert was recorded at Le Zénith in Paris in October 1995, during the D'eux Tour. The CD contains also few English songs, including studio recording of "To Love You More", which became a smash hit in Japan.

The disc does not contain the full show. All songs can be found on the Live à Paris home video, released also in 1996.

Critical reception

AllMusic said that the album "has more of a rock feel than any of Dion's other live or studio albums" and "Dion raises the roof and proves just as adept with harder material as she is with adult contemporary ballads". According to them "this good live album from one of the biggest stars of our time serves to showcase her not only as a balladeer, but as a first-rate rock star".

Commercial performance
Live à Paris has debuted at number one in France, selling 200,000 copies in its first week. On 1 November 1996, Dion wrote a new page in the record book of French music industry, becoming the very first artist to have three of her albums chart simultaneously in the French Top 20. That week, Live à Paris entered the chart on top position (her 3rd number 1 album in France that year), while Falling into You (seven months after it entered the chart) was still at the 6th position and D'eux was still at number 16 (a year and a half after its release).

Following the successful D'eux, Live à Paris has sold 2 million copies in Europe alone, where it was certified 2× Platinum by the IFPI.

After selling 810,000 copies in France and 280,000 copies in Canada, it was certified 2× Platinum in both countries. The album was also certified Platinum in Belgium and Switzerland. In non-Francophone countries, like the Netherlands and Poland, Live à Paris achieved Gold status.

The album topped the charts for eight weeks in France, for four weeks in Belgium Wallonia and one week in Switzerland and Quebec. In Belgium Flanders, it peaked at number 6, and in Canada at number 7. Live à Paris also charted in many non-Francophone countries, reaching number 9 in the Netherlands, number 24 in Austria, number 25 in New Zealand, number 46 in Italy, number 53 in the United Kingdom and number 63 in Germany. On the European Top 100 Albums, Live à Paris peaked at number 6.

Accolades

Live à Paris won a Juno Award for Best Selling Francophone Album and two Félix Awards for Best Selling Album and Best Pop Rock Album.

Track listing

Charts

Weekly charts

Year-end charts

All-time charts

Certifications and sales

Release history

See also
Juno Award for Francophone Album of the Year

References

External links
 

1996 live albums
Albums produced by David Foster
Celine Dion live albums
Juno Award for Francophone Album of the Year albums